Guy Beaulne,  (23 December 1921 – 1 October 2001) was a French Canadian actor and theatre director.

Born in Ottawa, Ontario, he received a Bachelor of Arts and Bachelor of Philosophy from the University of Ottawa. He also had a Normal School Teacher Diploma.

In 1953, he directed the Quebec television series, La famille Plouffe. From 1970 to 1976, he was the Director of the Grand Théâtre de Québec.

Honours
 In 1967, he was awarded the Canadian Centennial Medal.
 In 1972, he was made a Fellow of the Royal Society of Canada.
 In 1975, he was made a Member of the Order of Canada "in recognition of his contribution to the development of theatre in Canada". 
 In 1992, he was awarded the 125th Anniversary of the Confederation of Canada Medal.
 In 1993, he was made a Knight of the National Order of Quebec.

References

External links
 Guy Beaulne at The Canadian Encyclopedia

1921 births
2001 deaths
Canadian theatre directors
Fellows of the Royal Society of Canada
Knights of the National Order of Quebec
Members of the Order of Canada
Male actors from Ottawa

University of Ottawa alumni